The 2020–21 Wyoming Cowgirls basketball team represented the University of Wyoming in the 2020–21 college basketball season. The Cowgirls were led by head coach Gerald Mattinson, in his second season. The Cowgirls played their home games at the Arena-Auditorium and are members of the Mountain West Conference. The beginning of the season was delayed until at least November 25, as a result of the COVID–19 pandemic.

Previous season
The Cowgirls finished the 2019–20 season 17–12, 12–6 in Mountain West play to finish in third place. They defeated Utah State in the Mountain West tournament before losing to Boise State in the semifinals. They didn't play in a postseason tournament.

Offseason

Departures

Arrivals

Roster

Statistics

Schedule

|-
!colspan=9 style=| Non–Conference

|-
!colspan=9 style=| Mountain West Conference

|-
!colspan=9 style=| Mountain West Women's Tournament

|-
!colspan=9 style="background:#492f24; color:#ffc425;"| NCAA tournament

References

'

Wyoming Cowgirls basketball seasons
Wyoming
Wyoming Cowgirls
Wyoming Cowgirls
Wyoming